The Yellow Wallpaper is a 2011 direct-to-video Gothic thriller film directed by Logan Thomas. It is based on the 1892 short story of the same name written by Charlotte Perkins Gilman.

Synopsis 
The film The Yellow Wallpaper was directed by Logan Thomas in 2011. However, the film is an original story rather than a direct adaptation of the famous Charlotte Perkins Gilman story, drawing from the original short story and a number of Gilman's other gothic works such as The Giant Wisteria and The Unwatched Door. Therefore, the film is an original narrative of events that unfold around the actual writing of “The Yellow Wallpaper”.<ref>{{Cite journal |last=Gilman |first=Charlotte Perkins |date=July 2011 |title='Why I wrote The Yellow Wallpaper?''' |url=http://dx.doi.org/10.1192/apt.17.4.265 |journal=Advances in Psychiatric Treatment |volume=17 |issue=4 |pages=265 |doi=10.1192/apt.17.4.265 |issn=1355-5146}}</ref> The film's plot is greatly expanded from the bare bones of Gilman's often-anthologized short story. It stars Juliet Landau as Charlotte and Aric Cushing as her husband John, Golden Globe winner Michael Moriarty as Mr. Hendricks, Veronica Cartwright, Raymond J. Barry, and Independent Spirit Award winner Dale Dickey. The story surrounds Charlotte and John, who retreat to a countryside house in an attempt to start their life over after a devastating fire takes the life of their daughter. Soon the spirit of the deceased Sarah and other spirits are haunting the house.

 Plot 
Charlotte, a writer, and her husband John, a doctor, retreat to a countryside house with Charlotte's well educated sister Jennie in an attempt to start their life over after a devastating fire takes the life of their daughter Sarah as well as all of their money and possessions. The house is full of dusty and rotten books, furniture, clothing, etc. John attempts to go into town to make money and runs into an older couple complaining of the rats in the town. John then checks the house for rats and finds some underneath the house. At night, Charlotte begins to go to the attic to write as the interesting wallpaper sparks ideas. John awakes one night to find a man in the house. He attempts to find the man in the house but fails. The next night, Charlotte, John, and Jennie hear a man stomping on the roof. John goes outside to shoot him but instead finds a little girl on the roof. He tells Jennie and Charlotte that the fog got in his way and does not mention the girl. John tells his friend Jack about the fire and how he was feeling, Jack then tells both him and Charlotte that they should make another child. Charlotte begins to hear the voice of her daughter Sarah in the house, she runs inside to find her, and the doors shut John out. When John tries to open them, they shut on their own. Jennie says that they should move houses, but both John and Charlotte believe that Sarah is somehow in the house. After Jennie has dreams about the same little girl John had seen on roof, she digs a hole in the ground where the dream happened and discovered two coffins. Jennie moves back East and leaves Charlotte and John alone in the house. John and Charlotte begin to make their house a home, becoming closer to each other and spending more time together. They do activities together such as walking and dancing. Charlotte begins to write more. She writes The Yellow Wallpaper, a story about someone living in the yellow wallpaper in the attic. Jennie returns with Catherine, a psychic. Charlotte and John are upset because they are finally happy with their situation. Catherine says that there are spirits behind the wallpaper, including Sarah and many others. Charlotte asks if she can speak to Sarah and Charlotte says it's a bad idea. Catherine states that there's a spirit under the house calling for John. John goes under the house and his lantern goes out. John returns with Sarah in his arms. They bring Sarah inside and she states that she has been burning in Hell this entire time. The man that John had seen in the beginning appears and says that they will all burn in Hell and then both he and Sarah disappear. Charlotte breaks down and wants to find Sarah again, then suddenly becomes severely sick. Jennie, Charlotte, and John all leave the house. John tells the ladies to not go back into the house, then heads to town to get a carriage so they can all leave the house. John runs into a man who tells him to turn around. Charlotte and Jennie find a body in the previously opened coffins and feral dogs surround them as they look inside, and they run into the house for safety. When John returns to the house, he cannot find his wife or Jennie. He sees the spirits in the house, and they tell him he should've left a long time ago. After being struck by one of the spirits, he finds his dead wife. His friend Jack returns and tells John that Charlotte has now turned into a spirit. He tells John that the diseased house will keep her spirit alive as long as he can bring her souls that she can feed upon. If she is fed, she will live at night and be able to manipulate and control animals. John takes Charlotte and places her in the grave outside. The film cuts to modern time, the house is now slightly updated, and a vaguely older John is showing the house to a couple for rent, so he can continue the cycle of feeding his love.

Production 
Most of the scenes in The Yellow Wallpaper were shot in Eatonton, Georgia, in and around an isolated Civil War-era house. The farmhouse's location is undisclosed, meant to represent, as the director puts it, ' a space outside of space'. Jessi Case recalled being a little frightened of the house where the film was shot. 'The stairs leading to the attic, where we filmed a lot of the scenes, were very narrow and it was very hot. They didn't want me to go outside because my hair would poof up'.

After the shooting of the film, Michael Moriarty retired from acting, after an illustrious career in which he won a Tony award, numerous Emmy awards, and a Golden Globe award. It was his last feature film role.

The script was written in three months by Logan Thomas and Aric Cushing, and Cushing said his goal was to popularize Gilman's work.

Director Thomas used the Digital Sony 950, and the film is the first ever period feature film to be shot with this digital format. Thomas is becoming known as a "visualist" director in the tradition of David Lynch and Ridley Scott.

Juliet Landau, during an interview, compared her role to Nicole Kidman's role in "The Others".

This was Kyla Kennedy's first role at the age of 3, before going on to work on shows such as The Walking Dead and Speechless.

The film is a seminal role for actor Aric Cushing and the last film role of actor Ted Manson, who also appeared in The Curious Case of Benjamin Button with Brad Pitt.

A companion book to the film was written, The Yellow Wallpaper and Other Gothic Stories, by Aric Cushing. The book features two stories previously unpublished since their inception, and seemingly lost. The essay in the beginning of the book was written by Cushing entitled "Is the Yellow Wallpaper a Gothic Story?"

 Release 
The film has 0 reviews from critics on Rotten Tomatoes and therefore lacks a score on the website.

After the film's release, the film was picked up by Netflix, iTunes, and various distribution outlets in the United States and subsequently released on Amazon.

Aric Cushing said of the release of the film: "In the 1990s the trend in acquisition, as well as public consumption, was independent films. You could write, produce, and distribute a movie and make money. Redbox and Amazon has now killed that almost completely."

Upon the film's release, reviewers were polarized with such statements as "'Even as straight horror without any implications of living up to an established narrative, “Wallpaper” plays against some traditional horror conventions – and not in a good way.'" and "the film is atmospheric but feels at times that it is too languid in its approach." While other reviews commented, "'Luckily, the cliches are kept to a minimum, and as it turns out it's actually a rather unique take on the material, deftly blending psychological terror into the mix in a manner not unlike The Shining.'" and "The idea of male dominance and male-dominated culture is a favorite issue of Gilman’s, as well as the idea of there being no escape.  That issue runs through most of her works, and “The Yellow Wallpaper” is no different.  The movie version may be tamer, but the underlying theme is indeed still there.  And while there are definitely similarities and differences between the two, when it comes down to it, in the end both women end up becoming the woman behind the wallpaper." Cushing commented in the introduction to his book Lost Essays, the film was both loved and loathed. The director Logan Thomas's comments on the film after the release were, "we never thought of it as a horror movie, more of a gothic mind bender" and, commenting on his new feature film There's No Such Thing as Vampires, "I certainly didn't want to do another slow-burn movie that was a head puzzle like The Yellow Wallpaper".

 Cast 
 Aric Cushing as Dr. John Weiland
 Juliet Landau as Charlotte Weiland
 Dale Dickey as Jennie Gilman
 Raymond J. Barry as Dr. Jack Everland
 Veronica Cartwright as Catherine Sayer
 Michael Moriarty as Mr. Isaac Hendricks
 Ted Manson as Sage at Duel
 Alex Schemmer as Duellist
 Keller Wortham as Duellist
 Jessi Case as Sarah Weiland at age 8
 Gena Kay as Colleen Preston
 Joseph Williamson as Travis Preston
 Sharon Blackwood as Mrs. Foucoult at Tea Party
 Stephanie Wing as Mrs. Tremayne at Tea Party
 Holly Stevenson as Mrs. Steele at Tea Party
 Cindy Pain as Mrs. Daygeron at Tea Party
 Margie Mack as Rat Woman
 Bob King as Rat Man
 Pieter Kloos as Eckhart Van Wakefield
 Earl Maddox as Burn in Hell Man
Kyla Kennedy as Sarah Weiland at age 3
 Fara Eve Soleil as 17th Century Woman
 Thomas Rouzer as Mysterious Man in House
 Oliver R. Smith as William at Duel
 Wayne Dutton as Carriage Driver
 Brian Bremer as Man in Field (Scenes Deleted)

 Bibliography 
Hischak, Thomas S. (2012). American Literature on Stage and Screen. McFarland. .

Gilman, Charlotte Perkins and Cushing, Aric. The Yellow Wallpaper and Other Stories: The Complete Gothic Collection. Ascent. .

Cushing, Aric and Thomas, Logan. The Yellow Wallpaper: The Official Motion Picture Screenplay''. .

References

External links
 
The Yellow Wallpaper at AllMovie
The Yellow Wallpaper at Rotten Tomatoes
The Yellow Wallpaper at WorldCat
The Yellow Wallpaper at Letterboxd

2010s English-language films
Films based on American short stories
Films shot in Georgia (U.S. state)